Internet Relay Chat (IRC) is an internet protocol primarily for channel-oriented text communication.

IRC may also refer to:

Organisations 
 Australian Industrial Relations Commission, a workplace relations tribunal in Australia
 Industrial Reorganisation Corporation, a now defunct entity of the British government
 Inland Regional Center, an organization providing services for people with developmental disabilities in southern California
 International Red Cross and Red Crescent Movement, a worldwide health protection movement
 Immigration, Refugees and Citizenship Canada, a department of the federal government of Canada
 Immigration Removal Centre, the official name for immigration detention centre in the United Kingdom
 Independence Republic of Sardinia, a social-democratic and non-violent separatist political party based in Sassari, Sardinia, Italy
 International Rescue Committee, an organization that assists refugees
 International Rescue Corps, a search and rescue organisation based in the United Kingdom
 IRC (organization), a think and do tank for water hygiene and sanitation services in The Hague, the Netherlands
 IRC Limited, a Hong Kong-based industrial commodities business
 IRC Tire, a brand of Inoue Rubber Co., Ltd.

Places 
 Circle City Airport, an airport in Circle City, Alaska, United States
 Indian River County, Florida, a county in Florida, United States

Science, technology and internet 
 Two-Micron Sky Survey catalogue entries have the form IRC followed by a five-digit number, standing for infrared catalogue
IRC -10414, a red supergiant star
IRC +10420, a yellow hypergiant star
 Incrementally related carriers, a standard for video channel frequencies
 Infrared reflective coating, on a type of incandescent light bulb
 IRC-Galleria, a social networking website in Finland commonly called "IRC"
 Intrinsic reaction coordinate in the analysis of the energy profile of a chemical reaction
 IRC (sailing), a system of handicapping sailboats and yachts for the purpose of racing

Other uses 
 Immigration Removal Centre, a facility for holding individuals suspected of visa violations; see Immigration detention
 Internal Revenue Code, the federal tax code used in the United States
 International reply coupon, used to post a letter to most countries
 International Residential Code, a set of codes and standards; see International Building Code
 International Rostrum of Composers, an annual forum for the promotion of contemporary classical music
 Intercontinental Rally Challenge, a rally championship

See also 
 Infrared reflective coating, on insulated glazing